Tashigang
(transl. "auspicious hillock"),
with a Chinese spelling Zhaxigang ,
is a village in the Gar County of the Ngari Prefecture, Tibet.
The village forms the central district of the Zhaxigang Township.
It houses an ancient monastery dating to the 11th century.

Geography 

Tashigang is in the Indus Valley, close to the border with Ladakh (Indian union territory), near the confluence of the Sengge Zangbo and Gartang rivers (the two headwaters of the Indus River). Sven Hedin described the Tashigang monastery as follows:

Tashigang was described by European travellers in the 18th and 19th centuries as the first Tibetan village, as they travelled from Ladakh towards Kailas–Manasarovar.
It was at a distance of a day's march from Demchok, which was regarded as the Ladakh–Tibet border since the 17th-century Treaty of Tingmosgang between the two nations.

History

Early medieval period 
During the Tibetan Era of Fragmentation, Kyide Nyimagon, a descendant of emperor Langdarma escaped to Western Tibet (then called Ngari or Ngari Khorsum) and established a small kingdom at Rala in the Sengge Zangbo valley close to Tashigang. He built a red fort (Kharmar). (See Strachey's map for Rala.) Subsequently, Nyimagon expanded his kingdom to the entire Ngari. After his death, the kingdom was divided among his three sons, the eldest son receiving Maryul (Ladakh and Rudok), the second son receiving Guge-Purang and the third son Zanskar (in western Ladakh). According to the current interpretations of the sources, Ladakh's southern border was at Demchok Karpo, a stony white peak beside the Ladakhi village of Demchok. This would lead to the conclusion that Tashigang and the original Kharmar fort were part of Guge.

Medieval period 
A monastery was founded at Tashigang by the New Tantra Tradition school of Rinchen Zangpo during the 10th–11th centuries. During the 13th–14th centuries, it was  converted into a Kagyu monastery, along with several others in western Guge. Karl Ryavec suggests that this may have happened due to some political decline in the kingdom.

Ladakhi ruler Sengge Namgyal conquered and annexed Guge in 1630. He is credited with building a new monastery at Tashigang.
It was a Drukpa monastery associated with Taktsang Repa.

During the reign of Sengge Namgyal's successor, Deldan Namgyal, Ladakh faced an invasion from Central Tibet under the Fifth Dalai Lama, who was at that time being assisted by the Mongol army. The forces defeated the Ladakhis in Guge, key battles being fought near Rala, and then invaded Ladakh itself. After three years of siege, the Ladakhis requested the help of Kashmiris (under Mughal empire), who drove them out of Ladakh. The retreating troops fled to Tashigang where they ensconced themselves in its fort.

Twenty five Mongol military officers are said to have settled in Tashigang. In 1715, the Jesuit missionary Ippolito Desideri found the region garrisoned by a body of "Tartar" (Mongol) and Tibetan troops, headed by a "Tartar prince". Even today, their descendants are called sog dmag ("the twenty-five Mongol Warriors"). The Drukpa monastery of Tashigang was converted to the Gelugpa order.

Modern period

Demographics 
In 2013, Zhaxigang Village consisted of 111 households with a total of 332 people.

Notes

References

Bibliography

External links 
 Zhaxigang Township, OpenStreetMap, retrieved 8 September 2021.

Populated places in Ngari Prefecture